Lieutenant General Gustav Ivar Backlund (14 February 1892 – 5 July 1969) was a Swedish Army officer. His senior commands include Commandant in Boden Fortress, Chief of the Army Staff and the General Staff Corps. Backlund was also military commander of the VII Military District and head of the Swedish National Defence College.

Early life
Backlund was born on 14 February 1892 in Gothenburg, Sweden, the son of Anders Backlund, a phytosanitary inspector, and his wife Thérese Floberg. He passed studentexamen in 1909.

Career
Backlund  was commissioned as an officer in 1912 and was assigned with the rank of underlöjtnant to Göta Life Guards (I 2). He attended the Royal Swedish Army Staff College from 1918 to 1920 and served as captain in the General Staff in 1924. Backlund was adjutant to the head of the Ministry of Defence from 1926 to 1928 and served as a general staff officer in the Militärläroverksinspektionen from 1928 to 1933. Backlund was teacher at the Artillery and Engineering College from 1933 to 1937 and was promoted to major in 1934. He was then serving as vice chief of the Military Office of the Land Defence (Lantförsvarets kommandoexpedition) from 1937 to 1939 and he was promoted to lieutenant colonel in 1937.

Backlund served in Södermanland Infantry Regiment (I 10) in 1939 and the year after he was promoted to colonel and was appointed regimental commander of the Dalarna Regiment (I 13). In 1944, Backlund was appointed Commandant in Boden Fortress and he served as acting deputy military commander of the IV Military District from 1944 to 1946. He was promoted to major general in 1946 and served as Chief of the Army Staff and the General Staff Corps from 1946 to 1948. Backlund was military commander of the VII Military District from 1 October 1948 to 31 March 1955 and head of the Swedish National Defence College from 1 April 1955 to 1956. He was promoted to lieutenant general in 1957 and retired from the military.

He became chairman of the Swedish Pistol-shooting Association (Svenska pistolskytteförbundet) in 1946 and the Educational Swedish Swimming Association (Svenska livräddningssällskapet) in 1947.

Personal life
In 1935, he married Margareta Troili (born 1904), the daughter of Eilert Troili, an accountant, and Gunhild Behmer.

Dates of rank
1912 – Underlöjtnant
19?? – Lieutenant
1924 – Captain
1934 – Major
1937 – Lieutenant colonel
1940 – Colonel
1946 – Major general
1957 – Lieutenant general

Awards and decorations

Swedish
   Commander Grand Cross of the Order of the Sword (6 June 1953)
   Commander 1st Class of the Order of the Sword (6 June  1946)
   Commander 2nd Class of the Order of the Sword (15 November 1943)
   Knight 1st Class of the Order of the Sword (1933)
   Knight of the Order of the Polar Star (1939)
   Knight 1st Class of the Order of Vasa (1928)
   Medal for Noble Deeds (För medborgerlig förtjänst) in gold

Foreign
   Commander of the Order of the White Rose of Finland (between 1940 and 1942)
   Commander Second Class of the Order of the White Rose of Finland (between 1935 and 1940)
   Commander of the Order of the Lion of Finland (between 1947 and 1950)
   Order of the German Eagle (1942)
   Knight of the Order of Leopold (between 1925 and 1928)

Honours
Member of the Royal Swedish Academy of War Sciences (1938)

Footnotes

References

1892 births
1969 deaths
Swedish Army lieutenant generals
Military personnel from Gothenburg
Members of the Royal Swedish Academy of War Sciences
Commanders Grand Cross of the Order of the Sword
Knights of the Order of the Polar Star
Knights First Class of the Order of Vasa